Pakistan Infrastructure Bank is a proposed bank in Pakistan. International Finance Corporation will have 20 percent share in this bank while Government of Pakistan will contribute 20 percent through Development Fund. The bank was proposed in April 2017 in the third Nawaz Sharif ministry.

References

Banks of Pakistan
Banking in Pakistan
Development finance institutions